FAPI can refer to:

 Functional APIs
 Fellow of the Australian Property Institute
 Foreign Accrual Property Income rules (see Copthorne Holdings Ltd v Canada)
 Financial-grade API
 Pietersburg Civil Aerodrome